Yicheng District is the only district of the city of Zhumadian, Henan province, China.

Administrative divisions 
As 2017, this district is divided to 13 subdistricts, 5 towns and 3 townships.
Subdistricts

Towns

Townships
Laohe Township
Zhugudong Township
Humiao Township

References

County-level divisions of Henan
Zhumadian